Michael Kostner (born 7 February 1969) is a German football coach and a former player who is currently, as of 1 July 2012, is managing TSV Dorfen.

Honours
 DFB-Pokal winner: 1987–88

References

1969 births
Living people
German footballers
German football managers
Eintracht Frankfurt players
Eintracht Frankfurt II players
Kickers Offenbach players
1. FC Saarbrücken players
Hamburger SV players
FC 08 Homburg players
1. FC Köln players
SV Wacker Burghausen players
Bundesliga players
2. Bundesliga players
Association football midfielders
Footballers from Munich